is a former Japanese football player. He played for Japan national team.

Club career
Nishi was born in Takatsuki on May 9, 1980. After graduating from high school, he joined Júbilo Iwata in 1999. He played many matches from first season. The club won the champions 1999, 2002 J1 League and 2003 Emperor's Cup. In Asia, the club won the champions 1998–99 Asian Club Championship and 2nd place 1999–00 and 2000–01 Asian Club Championship. His opportunity to play decreased for injury from 2004. In 2009 and 2010, he played most matches and the club won 2010 J.League Cup. He moved to Tokyo Verdy in 2012 and played until 2013. After that, he played for Police United (2014) and Okinawa SV (2016). He retired end of 2016 season.

National team career
In September 2000, Nishi was elected Japan U-23 national team for 2000 Summer Olympics, but he did not play in the match.

On April 25, 2004, Nishi debuted for Japan national team against Hungary. In July, he was elected Japan for 2004 Asian Cup. He played 2 matches and Japan won the champions. He played 5 games for Japan in 2004.

Club statistics

National team statistics

Appearances in major competitions

Honors and awards

Club
Júbilo Iwata
 AFC Champions League: 1999
 Asian Super Cup: 1999
 J1 League: 1999, 2002
 Emperor's Cup: 2003
 Japanese Super Cup: 2000, 2003, 2004

International
Japan
 AFC Asian Cup: 2004

References

External links

 
 Japan National Football Team Database
 

1980 births
Living people
Association football people from Osaka Prefecture
People from Takatsuki, Osaka
Japanese footballers
Japan international footballers
J1 League players
J2 League players
Júbilo Iwata players
Tokyo Verdy players
Footballers at the 2000 Summer Olympics
Olympic footballers of Japan
2004 AFC Asian Cup players
AFC Asian Cup-winning players
Expatriate footballers in Thailand
Association football midfielders